The Pendulum, the Pit and Hope is a 1983 Czechoslovak animated short film directed by Jan Švankmajer, adapted from Edgar Allan Poe's 1842 short story "The Pit and the Pendulum" and Auguste Villiers de l'Isle-Adam's story "A Torture by Hope".

Awards
 Montréal World Film Festival 1984 – Won Jury Prize (Short Films)
 Kraków Film Festival 1984 – Won FICC Award
 International Short Film Festival Oberhausen 1985 – Won Grand Prize and FIPRESCI Award
 Fantasporto 1985 – Won Critics' Award - Special Mention

External links

References

1983 films
1983 short films
1980s stop-motion animated films
Czechoslovak black-and-white films
Czechoslovak animated short films
Czech animated films
Czech short films
Czech horror films
Films based on The Pit and the Pendulum
Films directed by Jan Švankmajer
Films shot from the first-person perspective
Surrealist films
1980s Czech films
Czech animated horror films
Adaptations of works by Auguste Villiers de l'Isle-Adam